Acanthocardia spinosa, the sand cockle, is a species of  saltwater clams, marine bivalve molluscs in the family Cardiidae. The genus Acanthocardia is present from the Upper Oligocene to the Recent.

Description
The shell of Acanthocardia spinosa can reach a size of 60–95 mm. This shell is robust, round with a heart-shaped profile, equivalve and inflated, with crenulated margins. The surface shows thick narrowly spaced radial ribs, with rows of pronounced thorny hooks. The basic external coloration is usually pale brown; the interior is white.

Distribution and habitat
Acanthocardia spinosa can be found in the Mediterranean Sea. This species is present in sand and mud, from low waters to 120 m. Like almost all bivalves, these mollusks are phytoplankton feeders.

References

 Repetto G., Orlando F. & Arduino G. (2005): Conchiglie del Mediterraneo, Amici del Museo "Federico Eusebio", Alba, Italy
 Biolib
 Encyclopedia of life
 World Register of Marine Species
 Shell.sinica

External links
 spinosa Conchology
 Marine Species Identification
 Kmcollection

Cardiidae
Molluscs described in 1786